Iizuka is a Japanese surname. Notable people with the surname include:

, Japanese footballer
, Japanese shogi player
, Japanese scientific researcher and engineer
Kunisaburo Iizuka (1875–1958), Japanese judoka
, Japanese voice actress and singer
Naomi Iizuka (born 1965), American playwright
Shōkansai Iizuka (1919–2004), Japanese artist
, Japanese sprinter
, Japanese voice actor
, Japanese professional wrestler
, Japanese video game designer
, Japanese footballer
, Japanese ice hockey player and coach

Japanese-language surnames